The Monk is an epithet for:

Abraham the Monk, Christian monk who converted to Judaism about 614
Cosmas the Monk, 7th-century Sicilian monk
Epiphanius the Monk, 8th or 9th-century monk, priest, and author in Constantinople
Eustace the Monk (c. 1170–1217), mercenary and pirate born near Boulogne
Isaija the Monk, 14th-century Serbian monk, writer, translator and diplomat
Jacob Chornoryzets, 11th-century Russian monk and author
Jacob the Monk (Lebanon), 6th-century Christian monk
Marina the Monk, 6th-century Christian saint
Nikephoros the Monk, 13th-century monk and spiritual writer of the Eastern Orthodox Church
Robert the Monk (d. 1122), Roman Catholic monk and a chronicler of the First Crusade
Theodoric the Monk, 12th-century Norwegian Benedictine monk and historian

Monk
Lists of people by epithet